Robinsons GenSan (formerly Robinsons Place General Santos and Robinsons Place GenSan) is a mall located on Jose Catolico Avenue, Lagao, General Santos in the Philippines. It was the flagship and largest mall of Robinsons Land Corporation in Mindanao (until Robinsons Place Butuan, upon its mall opening on November, 2013). The mall had its soft opening on September 30, 2009 and the grand opening took place on Monday, October 5, 2009.

One of the mall's main tenants is the DFA Consular Office General Santos which opened at the ground floor in September 2012.

References

Shopping malls in the Philippines
Shopping malls established in 2009
Buildings and structures in General Santos
Robinsons Malls